Alain St Ange (born 24 October 1954) is a Seychellois politician who served as Minister for Tourism and Culture, and later for Tourism, Civil Aviation, Ports and Marine, of Seychelles from 2012 to 2016. He is the former president, and one of the key founders, of the Vanilla Islands. He is the President of the African Tourism Board. He remains a well-reputed and highly sought-after tourism consultant.

Career
St Ange has been working in the tourism business since 2009. He was appointed as the Director of Marketing by President James Michel and Minister of Tourism. After one year of service, he was promoted to the CEO of the Seychelles Tourism Board. In 2012 the Indian Ocean Vanilla Islands regional Organization was formed and St Ange was appointed as the first president of the organization. In a 2012 cabinet re-shuffle, St Ange was appointed as Minister of Tourism and Culture. He was then given more responsibilities by President Danny Faure in 2016 when he became Minister of Tourism, Civil Aviation, Ports & Marine. He resigned on 28 December 2016 in order to pursue a candidacy as Secretary General of the World Tourism Organization which was withdrawn on 9 May 2017 due to the support of the African Union for Walter Mzembi, the Zimbabwean candidate. Alain St.Ange is today the President of the "One Seychelles" Political Party.

List of works
 Seychelles what next?, by Alain St Ange, 1991
 Seychelles : in search of democracy : a constitutional & political history of Seychelles, 1723-2004, by Alain Georges, Bernard, St. Ange, 2005, AISN B007HFWSU6
 Seychelles, The Cry of A People, by Alain St Ange, 2007, published by Imprimerie Toscane, 
 Seychelles, The 2010 Regatta, by Alain St Ange, 2011,

References

External links
Full list of published books
Ministry of Tourism Website
World Tourism Council Profile 

1954 births
Living people
Seychellois chief executives
Seychellois people of French descent
Aviation ministers of Seychelles
Culture ministers of Seychelles
Marine ministers of Seychelles
Tourism ministers of Seychelles